This list of tallest buildings in Shijiazhuang ranks skyscrapers in Shijiazhuang, Hebei, China by height. Tianshan Gate of the World Plots 27 and 28 will dethrone both towers upon its completion in 2025.

Shijiazhuang is the capital and the largest city in Hebei province. Just 2 hours away from China's capital, Beijing, it is one of the principal cities in the Jing-Jin-Ji Metropolitan Region. With 10 million residents in the prefecture level area and 4 million residents in the urban districts, it's the 26th most populous city in China.

Shijiazhuang ranks 58th in the world with 19 completed buildings taller than 150 m (492 ft).

Tallest Completed Buildings

Under Construction

Proposed

References

External links
Diagram of skyscrapers in Shijiazhuang on SkyscraperPage

Shijiazhuang
Skyscrapers in Hebei